André Trochut (Chermignac, 6 November 1931 — Geay, 4 August 1996) was a French professional road bicycle racer. In the 1957 Tour de France, Trochut won the 6th stage.

Major results

1957
Tour de France:
Winner stage 6
1958
Gourin
Le Guâ
1959
Lagnon
Castillon-la-Bataille

External links 

Official Tour de France results for André Trochut

1931 births
1996 deaths
Sportspeople from Charente-Maritime
French male cyclists
French Tour de France stage winners
Cyclists from Nouvelle-Aquitaine